Vishnupriya Ravi (born 18 October 1992), is an Indian playback singer and live performer.

Career
Vishnupriya found her passion for music at the age of 9 which led her parents to enroll her in music school. She trained in carnatic, hindustani and western classical. In 2013, she began her career as a playback singer with the song Chellakutty in the movie  Vallavanukku Pullum Aayudham composed by Siddharth Vipin. In 2016, she was nominated for Filmfare Award for Best Female Playback Singer – Telugu for the song Parashunara from the movie Dhruva along with Padmalatha. The song Everest Anchuna from the 2019 film Maharshi has become an instant chartbuster, with a 1.8 million views in YouTube within a day of its preview video release.

Personal life
Vishnupriya was born and brought up in Chennai, Tamil Nadu. She did her schooling at P. S. Senior Secondary School and graduated from M.O.P. Vaishnav College for Women.

Discography

References

External links
 
 

1992 births
Tamil playback singers
Telugu playback singers
Indian women playback singers
Singers from Chennai
21st-century Indian singers
21st-century Indian women singers
Living people